Cornelis van der Voort or van der Voorde (1576 – buried on 2 November 1624) was a Dutch Golden Age portrait painter from the early 17th century.

Life
Very little is known about Van der Voort's early life. He was born in Antwerp; his father was Pieter van der Voort, a painter. It is thought he studied with Cornelis Ketel. As a young man he was praised by Karel van Mander. In 1606 his brother Hans, a tailor, bought three parcels on which two houses were built. Hans moved into the one on the corner, and Cornelis in the one next to it. Only a few years later Cornelis sold the house; in 1639 Rembrandt and his wife Saskia van Uylenburgh moved in. Today it is the Rembrandt House Museum.

Around 1613 he was a member of the schutterij and painted a few schuttersstukken. At some time (before 1620) he inherited the house on the corner of the Sint Antoniesbreestraat from his brother.

Van der Voort probably had seven children and married twice: in 1598 with Geertrui Willems, who died in 1609, and in 1613 with Cornelia Brouwers. He died in Amsterdam and was buried on 2 November 1624. In August 1625 his inventory was sold. In 1626 his art business was taken over by Hendrick van Uylenburgh. His widow moved to Leiden.

Van der Voort painted full-length portraits in contemporary interiors: e.g. of Jan Cornelisz. Geelvinck as one of the regenten of a hospital, of Joan Huydecoper and his late wife and of Nicolaes Tulp. His work was in great demand and held in high esteem. In 1619 Van der Voort was the head of the Guild of St. Luke.  He had a strong influence on the early portraits of Rembrandt, as well as the work of Nicolaes Eliasz. Pickenoy and Thomas de Keyser. His own students included David Bailly, who copied his collection of paintings, Pieter Luyx, Dirk Harmensz. and probably Pieter Codde.

References

Sources
 Peter C. Sutton, “Frans Hals”, exhibition catalogue Museum of Fine Arts, Boston, Prized Possessions, European Paintings from Private Collections of Friends of the Museum of Fine Arts, Boston 17 July – 16 August 1992, p. 167. 
 Judikje Kiers and Fieke Tissink, “Companion Pieces” exhibition catalogue Rijksmuseum, Amsterdam, The Glory of the Golden Age, 15 April – 17 September 2000, p. 31.
 Gary Schwartz (1987) Rembrandt. Zijn leven, zijn schilderijen, p. 26, 30, 138, 139, 141, 174, 210, 213.

External links
 certificates
 http://www.virtual-history.com/person.php?personid=1131
 https://web.archive.org/web/20071107171401/http://www.steigrad.com/cat/vandervoort01.html
 http://www.museumkennemerland.nl/schilder.htm

1576 births
1624 deaths
Dutch Golden Age painters
Dutch male painters
Artists from Antwerp
Dutch art dealers